Lepteria is a genus of moths of the family Noctuidae. The genus was described by Schaus in 1913.

Species
Lepteria lorna Schaus, 1904
Lepteria parallela Dognin, 1914
Lepteria sacraria Hampson, 1918
Lepteria villalis Schaus, 1916
Lepteria viridicosta Schaus, 1912

References

Hadeninae